The 1918–19 Northern Rugby Football Union season was the first season of rugby league football following a break during the Great War. The ban on competitive matches was removed in September 1918, but official games did not regularly restart until January 1919. The season consisted of the Lancashire League and Yorkshire League, but the Championship did not restart until the 1919–20 season.

Rochdale Hornets won the Lancashire League, and Hull F.C. won the Yorkshire League. Rochdale Hornets beat Oldham 22–0 to win the Lancashire Cup, and Huddersfield beat Dewsbury 14–8 to win the Yorkshire County Cup.

Tables

Lancashire League

Yorkshire League

Challenge Cup
The Challenge Cup Competition was suspended for the final time following its absence during the war. The competition would return the following year.

References

1919 in English rugby league
Northern Rugby Football Union seasons
1918 in English rugby league